Obukhovsky is a rural locality (a settlement) in Karaulinsky Selsoviet, Kamyzyaksky District, Astrakhan Oblast, Russia. The population was 97 as of 2010. There are 2 streets.

Geography 
Obukhovsky is located 37 km south of Kamyzyak (the district's administrative centre) by road. Kirovsky is the nearest rural locality.

References 

Rural localities in Kamyzyaksky District